Krchleby is a municipality and village in Kutná Hora District in the Central Bohemian Region of the Czech Republic. It has about 400 inhabitants.

Administrative parts
The villages of Chedrbí is an administrative part of Krchleby.

References

Villages in Kutná Hora District